Bielec is a surname. Notable people with the surname include:

Frank Bielec (1947–2020), American interior designer, artist, and television personality
Paweł Bielec (1902–2002), Polish photographer and painter

Polish-language surnames